Zagortsi may refer to:

Zagortsi, Burgas Province
Zagortsi, Dobrich Province